Several ships have been named Renaissance.

 La Renaissance (1960) is a French inland waterways passenger vessel, converted from a cargo barge in 1997
  (1966) was a cruise liner, built for French company Paquet Cruises. She was sold in 1977 and subsequent names included Homeric Renaissance and World Renaissance.
  is a cruise ship, purchased by Compagnie Française de Croisières in 2022.
 Renaissance class cruiseships were named Renaissance I to Renaissance VIII, and operated by Renaissance Cruises between 1989 and 2001, including:
 Renaissance VII, built in 1991

References

Ship names